The women's heptathlon event at the 2015 African Games was held on 15–16 September.

Medalists

Results

100 metres hurdles
Wind:Heat 1: +0.4 m/s, Heat 2: –0.2 m/s

High jump

Shot put

200 metres
Wind:Heat 1: -0.1 m/s, Heat 2: +0.8 m/s

Long jump

Javelin throw

800 metres

Final standings

References

Heptathlon
2015 in women's athletics